Coal combustion products (CCPs), also called coal combustion wastes (CCWs) or coal combustion residuals (CCRs), are categorized in four groups, each based on physical and chemical forms derived from coal combustion methods and emission controls:

Fly ash is captured after coal combustion by filters (bag houses), electrostatic precipitators and other air pollution control devices. It comprises 60 percent of all coal combustion waste (labeled here as coal combustion products).It is most commonly used as a high-performance substitute for Portland cement or as clinker for Portland cement production. Cements blended with fly ash are becoming more common. Building material applications range from grouts and masonry products to cellular concrete and roofing tiles. Many asphaltic concrete pavements contain fly ash. Geotechnical applications include soil stabilization, road base, structural fill, embankments and mine reclamation. Fly ash also serves as filler in wood and plastic products, paints and metal castings.

Flue-gas desulfurization (FGD) materials are produced by chemical “scrubber” emission control systems that remove sulfur and oxides from power plant flue gas streams. FGD comprises 24 percent of all coal combustion waste. Residues vary, but the most common are FGD gypsum (or “synthetic” gypsum) and spray dryer absorbents. FGD gypsum is used in almost thirty percent of the gypsum panel products manufactured in the U.S. It is also used in agricultural applications to treat undesirable soil conditions and to improve crop performance. Other FGD materials are used in mining and land reclamation activities.
  
Bottom ash and boiler slag can be used as a raw feed for manufacturing portland cement clinker, as well as for skid control on icy roads. The two materials comprise 12 and 4 percent of coal combustion waste respectively. These materials are also suitable for geotechnical applications such as structural fills and land reclamation. The physical characteristics of bottom ash and boiler slag lend themselves as replacements for aggregate in flowable fill and in concrete masonry products. Boiler slag is also used for roofing granules and as blasting grit.

Environmental impacts

The majority of CCPs are landfilled, placed in mine shafts or stored in ash ponds at coal-fired power plants. Groundwater pollution from unlined ash ponds has been a continuing environmental problem in the United States. Additionally some of these ponds have had structural failures, causing massive ash spills into rivers, such as the 2014 Dan River coal ash spill. Federal design standards for ash ponds were strengthened in 2015. Following litigation challenges to various provisions of the 2015 regulations, EPA issued two final rules in 2020, labeled as the "CCR Part A" and ""CCR Part B" rules. The rules require some facilities to retrofit their impoundments with liners, while other facilities may propose alternative designs and request additional time to achieve compliance. In August 2021 EPA announced that it plans to publish a proposed rule in fall 2022 that would strengthen wastewater limits for discharges to surface waters.

Recycling
About 52 percent of CCPs in the U.S. were recycled for "beneficial uses" in 2019, according to the American Coal Ash Association. In Australia about 47% of coal ash was recycled in 2020. The chief benefit of recycling is to stabilize the environmental harmful components of the CCPs such as arsenic, beryllium, boron, cadmium, chromium, chromium VI, cobalt, lead, manganese, mercury, molybdenum, selenium, strontium, thallium, and vanadium, along with dioxins and polycyclic aromatic hydrocarbons.

References

Coal technology
Waste